Motherland is the fourth studio album by Arsonists Get All the Girls.

Background
Motherland was written and recorded in 2010.

Track listing

Personnel
All personnel is listed as on Allmusic:
Arsonists Get All the Girls
 Arthur Alvarez - guitar 
 Jaeson Bardoni - guitar
 Jared Monette - vocals, composition
 Sean Richmond - keyboards, backing vocals, lyrics
 Garin Rosen - drums
 Greg Howell - bass guitar
Additional personnel
 Kyle Stacher - fonts
 Zack Ohren - engineering, mastering, mixing, production
 Joshua Belanger - artwork design

References

Arsonists Get All the Girls albums
2011 albums
Century Media Records albums